Luke John Getsy (born February 16, 1984) is an American football coach and former quarterback who is the offensive coordinator for the Chicago Bears of the National Football League (NFL). He previously served as an assistant coach for the Green Bay Packers, Mississippi State University, Western Michigan University, Indiana University of Pennsylvania, the University of Pittsburgh, West Virginia Wesleyan College and the University of Akron.

Early years
Getsy was a four-year starting quarterback at Steel Valley High School.

Playing career

College
Getsy attended the University of Pittsburgh on a football scholarship. After spending two seasons with the Panthers, Getsy transferred to the University of Akron where he led the Zips to its first ever conference championship.  He also led Akron to its first-ever bowl game, the Motor City Bowl at Ford Field in Detroit. Getsy finished his career breaking 24 school records in two years as the Zips starter.

National Football League

San Francisco 49ers
Getsy signed as an undrafted free agent with the San Francisco 49ers prior to the 2007 season.

Coaching career

Akron
In 2007, Getsy began his coaching career at the University of Akron as a graduate assistant under head coach J. D. Brookhart.

West Virginia Wesleyan
In 2009, Getsy was hired by West Virginia Wesleyan College as their offensive coordinator, quarterbacks coach and academic coordinator.

Pittsburgh
In 2010, Getsy joined the University of Pittsburgh as a graduate assistant under head coach Dave Wannstedt.

Indiana University of Pennsylvania
In 2011, Getsy was hired as the offensive coordinator and quarterbacks coach at Indiana University of Pennsylvania under head coach Curt Cignetti.

Western Michigan
In 2013, Getsy was named the wide receivers coach at Western Michigan University under head coach P. J. Fleck.

Green Bay Packers
On February 7, 2014, Getsy was hired by the Green Bay Packers as an offensive quality control coach under head coach Mike McCarthy. In 2016, he was promoted to wide receivers coach.

Mississippi State
On December 31, 2017, Getsy was hired as the offensive coordinator and wide receivers coach at Mississippi State University.

Green Bay Packers (second stint)
On January 21, 2019, Getsy was re-hired by the Green Bay Packers as their quarterbacks coach under head coach Matt LaFleur.
On March 12, 2020, he was promoted to passing game coordinator and quarterbacks coach.

Chicago Bears
On January 30, 2022, Getsy was hired by the Chicago Bears as their offensive coordinator under head coach Matt Eberflus.

References

External links

 Green Bay Packers profile (2019–2021)
 Green Bay Packers profile (2014–2017)
 Akron profile (2006)

1984 births
Living people
American football quarterbacks
Akron Zips football coaches
Akron Zips football players
Chicago Bears coaches
Green Bay Packers coaches
IUP Crimson Hawks football coaches
National Football League offensive coordinators
People from Munhall, Pennsylvania
Pittsburgh Panthers football coaches
Pittsburgh Panthers football players
Players of American football from Pennsylvania
San Francisco 49ers players
West Virginia Wesleyan Bobcats football coaches
Western Michigan Broncos football coaches